The eastern copperhead (Agkistrodon contortrix), also known as the copperhead, is a species of venomous snake, a pit viper, endemic to eastern North America; it is a member of the subfamily Crotalinae in the family Viperidae.

The eastern copperhead has distinctive, dark brown, hourglass-shaped markings, overlaid on a light reddish brown or brown/gray background. The body type is heavy, rather than slender. Neonates are born with green or yellow tail tips, which progress to a darker brown or black within one year.

In most of North America, it favors deciduous forest and mixed woodlands. It may occupy rock outcroppings and ledges, but is also found in low-lying, swampy regions. During the winter, it hibernates in dens or limestone crevices, often together with timber rattlesnakes and black rat snakes. The eastern copperhead is known to feed on a wide variety of prey, including invertebrates (primarily arthropods) and vertebrates. Like most pit vipers, the eastern copperhead is generally an ambush predator; it takes up a promising position and waits for suitable prey to arrive.

As a common species within its range, it may be encountered by humans. Unlike other viperids, they often "freeze" instead of slithering away, due to its habit of relying on excellent camouflage, rather than fleeing. Bites occur due to people unknowingly stepping on or near them.

Five subspecies have been recognized in the past, but recent genetic analysis had yielded new species information.

Etymology
Its generic name is derived from the Greek words ancistro (hooked) and odon (tooth), or fishhook.  The trivial name, or specific epithet, comes from the Latin contortus (twisted, intricate, complex), which is usually interpreted to reference the distorted pattern of darker bands across the snake's back, which are broad at the lateral base, but "pinched" into narrow hourglass shapes in the middle at the vertebral area.

Description
Some may exceed , although that is exceptional for this species. Brimley (1944) mentions a specimen of A. c. mokasen from Chapel Hill, North Carolina, that was "four feet, six inches" (137.2 cm), but this may have been an approximation.

The body is relatively stout and the head is broad and distinct from the neck. Because the snout slopes down and back, it appears less blunt than that of the cottonmouth, A. piscivorus. Consequently, the top of the head extends further forward than the mouth.

The escalation includes 21–25 (usually 23) rows of dorsal scales at midbody, 138–157 ventral scales in both sexes, and 38–62 and 37–57 subcaudal scales in males and females, respectively. The subcaudals are usually single, but the percentage thereof decreases clinally from the northeast, where about 80% are undivided, to the southwest of the geographic range where as little as 50% may be undivided. On the head are usually 9 large symmetrical plates, 6–10 (usually 8) supralabial scales, and 8–13 (usually 10) sublabial scales.

The color pattern consists of a pale tan to pinkish-tan ground color that becomes darker towards the foreline, overlaid with a series of 10–18 (13.4) crossbands. Characteristically, both the ground color and crossband pattern are pale in A. c. contortrix. These crossbands are light tan to pinkish-tan to pale brown in the center, but darker towards the edges. They are about two scales wide or less at the midline of the back, but expand to a width of 6–10 scales on the sides of the body. They do not extend down to the ventral scales. Often, the crossbands are divided at the midline and alternate on either side of the body, with some individuals even having more half bands than complete ones. A series of dark brown spots is also present on the flanks, next to the belly, and are largest and darkest in the spaces between the crossbands.

The belly is the same color as the ground color, but may be a little whitish in part. At the base of the tail are one to three (usually two) brown crossbands followed by a gray area. In juveniles, the pattern on the tail is more distinct: 7–9 crossbands are visible, while the tip is yellow. On the head, the crown is usually unmarked, except for a pair of small dark spots, one near the midline of each parietal scale. A faint postocular stripe is also present; diffuse above and bordered below by a narrow brown edge.

Several aberrant color patterns for A. c. contortrix, or populations that intergrade with it, have also been reported. In a specimen described by Livezey (1949) from Walker County, Texas, 11 of 17 crossbands were not joined middorsally, while on one side, three of the crossbands were fused together longitudinally to form a continuous, undulating band, surmounted above by a dark stripe that was 2.0–2.5 scales wide.

In another specimen, from Lowndes County, Alabama, the first three crossbands were complete, followed by a dark stripe that ran down either side of the body, with points of pigment reaching up to the midline in six places, but never getting there, after which the last four crossbands on the tail were also complete. A specimen found in Terrebonne Parish, Louisiana, by Ernest A. Liner, had a similar striped pattern, with only the first and last two crossbands being normal.

Distribution and habitat
Eastern copperheads found in North America; its range within the United States is in Alabama, Arkansas, Connecticut, Delaware, Florida, Georgia, Illinois, Indiana, Iowa, Kansas, Kentucky, Louisiana, Maryland, Massachusetts, Mississippi, Missouri, Nebraska, New Jersey, New York, North Carolina, Ohio, Oklahoma, Pennsylvania, South Carolina, Tennessee, Texas, Virginia, and West Virginia. In Mexico, it occurs in Chihuahua and Coahuila. The type locality is "Carolina".  Schmidt (1953) proposed the type locality be restricted to "Charleston, South Carolina".

Within its range, it occupies a variety of different habitats. In most of North America, it favors deciduous forest and mixed woodlands. It is often associated with rock outcroppings and ledges, but is also found in low-lying, swampy regions. During the winter, it hibernates in dens or limestone crevices, often together with timber rattlesnakes and black rat snakes. In the states around the Gulf of Mexico, however, this species is also found in coniferous forest. In the Chihuahuan Desert of West Texas and northern Mexico, it occurs in riparian habitats, usually near permanent or semipermanent water and sometimes in dry arroyos (brooks).

Conservation status
This species is classified as least concern on the IUCN Red List of Threatened Species (v3.1, 2001). This means that relative to many other species, it is not at risk of extinction in the near future. The population trend was stable when assessed in 2007.

Behavior
In the Southern United States, copperheads are nocturnal during the hot summer, but are commonly active during the day during the spring and fall. Unlike other viperids, they often "freeze" instead of slithering away, and as a result, many bites occur due to people unknowingly stepping on or near them. This tendency to freeze most likely evolved because of the extreme effectiveness of their camouflage. When lying on dead leaves or red clay, they can be almost impossible to notice. They frequently stay still even when approached closely, and generally strike only if physical contact is made. Like most other New World vipers, copperheads exhibit defensive tail vibration behavior when closely approached. This species is capable of vibrating its tail in excess of 40 times per second— faster than almost any other nonrattlesnake snake species.

Diet and feeding behavior

The eastern copperhead is a diet generalist and is known to feed on a wide variety of prey, including invertebrates (primarily arthropods) and vertebrates. A generalized ontogenetic shift in the diet occurs, with juveniles feeding on higher percentages of invertebrates and ectotherms, and adults feeding on a higher percentage vertebrate endotherms. Both juveniles and adults, though, feed on invertebrates and vertebrates opportunistically. The diet is also known to vary among geographic populations.

Studies conducted at various locations within the range of the eastern copperhead (A. contortrix), including Tennessee, Kentucky, Kansas, and Texas, identified some consistently significant prey items included cicadas (Tibicen), caterpillars (Lepidoptera), lizards (Sceloporus and Scincella), voles (Microtus), and mice (Peromyscus). Accounts of finding large numbers of copperheads in bushes, vines, and trees seeking newly emerged cicadas, some as high as 40 feet above ground, have been reported from Texas by various herpetologists.

Other items documented in the diet include various invertebrates, e.g. millipedes (Diplopoda), spiders (Arachnida), beetles (Coleoptera), dragonflies (Odonata), grasshoppers (Orthoptera), and mantids (Mantidae), as well as numerous species of vertebrates, including salamanders, frogs, lizards, snakes, small turtles, small birds, young opossums, squirrels, chipmunks, rabbits, bats, shrews, moles, rats, and mice.

Like most pit vipers, the eastern copperhead is generally an ambush predator; it takes up a promising position and waits for suitable prey to arrive. One exception to ambush foraging occurs when copperheads feed on insects such as caterpillars and freshly molted cicadas. When hunting insects, copperheads actively pursue their prey. Juveniles use a brightly colored tail to attract frogs and perhaps lizards, a behavior termed caudal luring. Sight, odor, and heat detection are used in locating prey, although after the prey has been envenomated, odor and taste become the primary means of tracking. Smaller prey items and birds are often seized and held in the mouth until dead, while larger prey items are typically bitten, released, and then tracked until dead. Copperheads occasionally feed on carrion. Gravid females typically fast, although some individuals occasionally take small volumes of food. An individual may eat up to twice its body mass in a year. One study found an individual that ate eight times during an annual activity period, totaling 1.25 times its body mass.

Reproduction
Eastern copperheads breed in late summer, but not every year; sometimes, females produce young for several years running, then do not breed at all for a time. The typical litter size is four to seven, but as few as one, or as many as 20 may be seen. Their size apart, the young are similar to the adults, but lighter in color, and with a yellowish-green-marked tip to the tail, which is used to lure lizards and frogs.

A. contortrix males have longer tongue tie lengths than females during the breeding season, which may aid in chemoreception of males searching for females.

Facultative parthenogenesis

Parthenogenesis is a natural form of reproduction in which growth and development of embryos occur without fertilization. A. contortrix can reproduce by facultative parthenogenesis, that is, they are capable of switching from a sexual mode of reproduction to an asexual mode.  The type of parthenogenesis that likely occurs is automixis with terminal fusion, a process in which two terminal products from the same meiosis fuse to form a diploid zygote.  This process leads to genome-wide homozygosity, expression of deleterious recessive alleles, and often to developmental failure (inbreeding depression).  Both captive-born and wild-born A. contortrix snakes appear to be capable of this form of parthenogenesis.

Venom
Although venomous, eastern copperheads are generally not aggressive and bites are rarely fatal. Copperhead venom has an estimated lethal dose around 100 mg, and tests on mice show its potency is among the lowest of all pit vipers, and slightly weaker than that of its close relative, the cottonmouth. Copperheads often employ a "warning bite" when stepped on or agitated and inject a relatively small amount of venom, if any at all. "Dry bites" involving no venom are particularly common with the copperhead, though all pit vipers are capable of a dry bite. Pit vipers that are dead are still dangerous and capable of producing venom in amounts that necessitate the use of antivenom.

Bite symptoms include extreme pain, tingling, throbbing, swelling, and severe nausea. Damage can occur to muscle and bone tissue, especially when the bite occurs in the outer extremities such as the hands and feet, areas in which a large muscle mass is not available to absorb the venom. A bite from any venomous snake should be taken very seriously and immediate medical attention sought, as an allergic reaction and secondary infection are always possible.

The venom of the southern copperhead has been found to hold a protein called "contortrostatin" that halts the growth of cancer cells in mice and also stops the migration of the tumors to other sites.  However, this is an animal model, and further testing is required to verify safety and efficacy in humans.

The antivenom CroFab is used to treat copperhead envenomations that demonstrate localized or systemic reactions to the venom.  As many copperhead bites can be dry (no envenomation), CroFab is not given in the absence of a reaction (such as swelling) due to the risk of complications of an allergic reaction to the treatment. The antivenom can cause an immune reaction called serum sickness. Pain management, tetanus immunization, laboratory evaluation, and medical supervision in the case of complications are additional courses of action. In 2002, an Illinois poison control center report on the availability of antivenom stated it used 1 Acp to 5 Acp depending on the symptoms and circumstances.

Subspecies

This species was long considered to contain five subspecies listed below, but gene analysis suggests that A. c. laticinctus represents its own distinct species, while A. c. mokasen and A. c. phaeogaster are regional variants of A. c. contortrix, and A. c. pictigaster is a regional variant of A. c. laticinctus.

Five subspecies have been recognized in the past, but recent genetic analysis shows that A c. contorix and two of the subspecies are monotypic, while Agkistrodon laticinctus (formerly Agkistrodon contortrix laticinctus) and the fifth subspecies are a single distinct species.

Gallery

References

Further reading

Behler JL, King FW (1979). The Audubon Society Field Guide to North American Reptiles and Amphibians. New York: Alfred A. Knopf.  . (Agkistrodon contortrix, pp. 683–684 + Plates 649–652, 655).
Boulenger GA (1896). Catalogue of the Snakes in the British Museum (Natural History). Volume III., Containing the ... Viperidæ. London: Trustees of the British Museum (Natural History). (Taylor and Francis, printers). xiv + 727 pp. + Plates I-XXV. (Ancistrodon contortrix, pp. 522–523).
Conant R (1975). A Field Guide to Reptiles and Amphibians of Eastern and Central North America, Second Edition. Boston: Houghton Mifflin. xviii + 429 pp. + Plates 1-48.  (hardcover),  (paperback). (Agkistrodon contortrix, pp. 226–228 + Plate 34 + Map 174).
Conant R, Bridges W (1939). What Snake Is That?: A Field Guide to the Snakes of the United States East of the Rocky Mountains. (with 108 drawings by Edmond Malnate). New York and London: D. Appleton-Century. Frontispiece map + viii + 163 pp. + Plates A-C, 1-32. (Agkistrodon mokasen, pp. 136–139 + Plate 27, Figures 79–81).
Gloyd HK (1934). "Studies on the Breeding Habits and Young of the Copperhead, Agkistrodon mokasen Beauvois". Papers Michigan Acad. Sci. 19: 587–604, 2 figures, 3 plates.
Holbrook JE (1838). North American Herpetology; or, A Description of the Reptiles Inhabiting the United States [First edition]. Vol II. Philadelphia: J. Dobson. (E.G. Dorsey, printer). 130 pp. + Plates I-XXX. (Trigonocephalus contortrix, pp. 69–72 + Plate XIV).
Holbrook JE (1842). North American Herpetology; or, A Description of the Reptiles Inhabiting the United States [Second edition]. Vol. III. Philadelphia: J. Dobson. (E.G. Dorsey, printer). 128 pp. + Plates I-XXX. (Trigonocephalus contortrix, pp. 39–42 + Plate VIII).
Hubbs B, O'Connor B (2012). A Guide to the Rattlesnakes and other Venomous Serpents of the United States. Tempe, Arizona: Tricolor Books. 129 pp. . (Agkistrodon contortrix, pp. 93–103).
Jan G, Sordelli F (1874). Iconographie générale des Ophidiens, Quarante-sixième livraison. Paris: Baillière. Index + Plates I-VI. (Trigonocephalus contortrix, Plate V, Figure 1). (in French).
Linnaeus C (1766). Systema naturæ per regna tria naturæ, secundum classes, ordines, genera, species, cum characteribus, differentiis, synonymis, locis. Tomus I. Editio Duodecima, Reformata. Stockholm: L. Salvius. 532 pp. (Boa contortrix, new species, p. 373). (in Latin).

Morris PA (1948). Boy's Book of Snakes: How to Recognize and Understand Them. A volume of the Humanizing Science Series, edited by Jaques Cattell. New York: Ronald Press. viii + 185 pp. (Agkistrodon contortrix, pp. 110–114, 181).
Powell R, Conant R, Collins JT (2016). Peterson Field Guide to Reptiles and Amphibians of Eastern and Central North America, Fourth Edition. Boston and New York: Houghton Mifflin Harcourt. xiv + 494 pp., 207 Figures, 47 color plates. . (Agkistrodon contortrix, pp. 436–437, Figure 197 + Plate 45).
Schmidt KP, Davis DD (1941). Field Book of Snakes of the United States and Canada. New York: G.P. Putnam's Sons. 365 pp. (Agkistrodon mokasen, pp. 283–285 + Plate 30).
Smith HM, Brodie ED Jr (1982). Reptiles of North America: A Guide to Field Identification. New York: Golden Press. 240 pp.  ("limp"),  (hardcover). (Agkistrodon contortrix, pp. 198–199).
Wright AH, Wright AA (1957). Handbook of Snakes of the United States and Canada. Ithaca and London: Comstock Publishing Associates. 1,105 pp. (in two volumes). (Ancistrodon contortrix, pp. 903–916 + Figures 259, 261–263 + Map 64).
Zim HS, Smith HM (1956). Reptiles and Amphibians: A Guide to Familiar American Species: A Golden Nature Guide. New York: Simon and Schuster. 160 pp. (Ancistrodon contortrix, pp. 109, 156).

External links

 
Copperhead on Reptiles and Amphibians of Iowa

contortrix
Fauna of the Southeastern United States
Reptiles of the United States
Venomous snakes
Articles containing video clips
Taxa named by Carl Linnaeus
Reptiles described in 1766